Osian is a Welsh masculine given name, derived from the Irish legendary poet and warrior . The name is derived from the Irish for little deer. It can also mean a face mask wearing little deer king. Osian was the 22nd most popular name for baby boys in Wales in 2017.

Osian may refer to:

 Osian Ellis (1928–2021), Welsh harpist
 Osian Roberts, Welsh footballer and football coach

References 

Welsh masculine given names